Dauphin Island is an island town in Mobile County, Alabama, United States, on a barrier island of the same name, in the Gulf of Mexico. It incorporated in 1988. The population was 1,778 at the 2020 census, up from 1,238 at the 2010 census. The town is part of the Mobile metropolitan area. The island (originally named Massacre Island) was renamed for Louis XIV of France's great-grandson and heir, the dauphin, the future Louis XV of France. The name of the island is often mistaken as Dolphin Island; the word dauphin is French for dolphin, but historically, the term was used as the title of the heir apparent to the French monarch.

The island is one of the Mississippi–Alabama barrier islands, with the Gulf of Mexico to the south, and the Mississippi Sound and Mobile Bay to the north. The island's eastern end helps define the mouth of Mobile Bay. The eastern, wider portion of the island is shaded by thick stands of pine trees and saw palmettos, but the narrow, western part of the island features scrub growth and few trees.

Dauphin Island is home to Fort Gaines, Dauphin Island Sea Lab, the Estuarium public aquarium, the Dauphin Island Airport, boat ramps, a large public pier that sits on dry land, historic sites, several restaurants, new condominium developments, and numerous private homes. Beaches attract tourism, and fishing is a popular activity in the waters around the island. The island is connected to the mainland by the Gordon Persons Bridge.

Although the island has several bird sanctuaries, the main one is the  Audubon Bird Sanctuary. Because Dauphin Island is the first land encountered by many birds as they migrate north from South America, many species can be found resting there before continuing their journey.

In May 2012, the central public beach began charging for access. This marked the second beach on the island to charge the public following the creation of the privately owned West End Beach.

History
Serpentine shell middens, perhaps 1,500 years old, attest to at least seasonal occupation by the Native American Mississippian Mound Builder culture. Shell Mound Park, along the island's northern shore, is administered by the Alabama Marine Resources Division.

In 1519, the Spanish explorer Alonso Álvarez de Pineda was the first documented European to visit, staying long enough to map the island with remarkable accuracy.

The island's French history began on January 31, 1699, when the explorer Pierre Le Moyne, sieur d'Iberville, one of the founders of French Louisiana, arrived at Mobile Bay and anchored near the island on his way to explore the mouth of the Mississippi River. D'Iberville mistakenly named it Île du Massacre (Massacre Island) because of a large pile of human skeletons discovered there. In reality, the site was a Mississippian burial mound which had been broken open by a hurricane, not a massacre site; however, the dramatic misnomer stuck.

D'Iberville later established a port for Fort Louis de La Louisiane on the island due to its abundant timber, reliable supply of fresh water, and deep-water harbor. The settlement consisted of a fort, a chapel, government-owned warehouses, and residences.

The island served as a major trading depot where goods from Saint-Domingue (Haiti), Mexico, Cuba and France were unloaded and a short-lived fur trade was conducted. Before a channel was dredged, Mobile Bay was too shallow and its sandbars too treacherous for ocean-going vessels to travel up the bay and Mobile River to Fort Louis de La Louisiane. Thus, smaller boats carried the cargo within Mobile Bay to and from Dauphin Island.

In 1719 the first African slaves of Alabama arrived at Dauphin Island. After the French and Indian War (known in Europe as the Seven Years' War) ended in 1763, the island was ceded to the British. After the American Revolutionary War, the territory again came under Spanish jurisdiction, being part of the Province of West Florida until 1812.

In 1795 after the Treaty of San Lorenzo was signed between Spain and the United States, new settlers began migrating to Alabama from Virginia, North & South Carolina and Georgia.

In 1805, the Chickasaw, Cherokee and Choctaw people were forced to cede their lands to the government. The Creek tribes aggressively fought to hold their lands, but eventually were forced to cede in 1813.

Fort Gaines on the eastern tip of the island was built between 1821 and 1848. It was occupied by Confederate forces in 1861 and captured by the Union Army during the Battle of Mobile Bay. The phrase, "Damn the torpedoes, full speed ahead," was supposedly spoken by U. S. Admiral David Farragut just a few hundred yards from Dauphin Island's shore.

The present lighthouse (1873; in use until 1970), has been placed on the National Register of Historic Places. Its ownership was recently transferred from the U.S. Department of Interior to the town of Dauphin Island.

Geography

The Dauphin Island Bridge, officially the Gordon Persons Bridge, is the island's sole road connection to the Alabama mainland, carrying State Route 193, which leads north  to Tillmans Corner in the southwest outskirts of Mobile.

Climate
The climate in this area is characterized by hot, humid summers and generally mild to cool winters.  According to the Köppen Climate Classification system, Dauphin Island has a humid subtropical climate, abbreviated "Cfa" on climate maps.

Demographics

2000 census

As of the census of 2000, there were 1,371 people (but falling in the 2010 census to 1238: see below) with 601 households and 418 families residing in the town. The population density was 221.2 people per square mile (85.4/km2). The racial makeup of the town was 96.43% White (1,322 persons), 0.44% Black or African American (6 persons), 1.60% Native American (22 persons), 0.58% Asian (8 persons), and 0.95% from two or more races (13 persons). Hispanic or Latino of any race were 0.95% of the population.

There were 601 households, out of which 21.6% had children under the age of 18 living with them, 61.7% were married couples living together, 5.0% had a female householder with no husband present, and 30.3% were non-families. 23.0% of all households were made up of individuals, and 6.3% had someone living alone who was 65 years of age or older. The average household size was 2.28 and the average family size was 2.66. In the town, the population was spread out, with 17.4% under the age of 18, 7.4% from 18 to 24, 25.7% from 25 to 44, 33.3% from 45 to 64, and 16.2% who were 65 years of age or older. The median age was 45 years. For every 100 females, there were 111.6 males. For every 100 females age 18 and over, there were 114.0 males.

The median income for a household in the town was $44,219, and the median income for a family was $50,476. Males had a median income of $35,179 versus $24,250 for females. The per capita income for the town was $22,552. About 6.0% of families and 9.2% of the population were below the poverty line, including 6.7% of those under age 18 and 5.4% of those age 65 or over.

2010 census
As of the census of 2010, there were 1,238 people, 582 households, and 373 families residing in the town. The population density was 199.7 people per square mile (77.4/km2). The racial makeup of the town was 97.3% White, 0.4% Black or African American, 1.0% Native American, 0.2% Asian, and 1.0% from two or more races. Hispanic or Latino of any race were 0.7% of the population.

There were 582 households, out of which 13.2% had children under the age of 18 living with them, 57.2% were married couples living together, 4.3% had a female householder with no husband present, and 35.9% were non-families. 28.4% of all households were made up of individuals, and 9.8% had someone living alone who was 65 years of age or older. The average household size was 2.10 and the average family size was 2.55.

In the town, the population was spread out, with 12.8% under the age of 18, 4.8% from 18 to 24, 18.0% from 25 to 44, 41.2% from 45 to 64, and 23.1% who were 65 years of age or older. The median age was 53 years. For every 100 females, there were 105.6 males. For every 100 females age 18 and over, there were 101.8 males.

The median income for a household in the town was $56,731, and the median income for a family was $54,844. Males had a median income of $47,308 versus $37,292 for females. The per capita income for the town was $26,771. About 11.4% of families and 15.3% of the population were below the poverty line, including 21.5% of those under age 18 and 0% of those age 65 or over.

2020 census

As of the 2020 United States census, there were 1,778 people, 585 households, and 424 families residing in the town.

Education
The town is served by the Mobile County Public School System. It has one public school, Dauphin Island Elementary School. Middle school students go on to Alba Middle School in Bayou La Batre and Alma Bryant High School in Bayou La Batre.

The Dauphin Island Sea Lab is located on the east end of the island on grounds formerly occupied by the 693rd Radar Squadron, Dauphin Island Air Force Station, US Air Force, and is home to the Marine Environmental Sciences Consortium.

Coat of arms

At the top of Dauphin Island's coat of arms is the historic Fort Gaines with two cannons facing north and south, which represent Dauphin Island's role during the Civil War. The boat is a shrimping vessel which represents the livelihood of many of the residents of the island. The dolphin is a mammal seen quite often in the Gulf of Mexico and Mobile Bay waters surrounding the island. The birds are pelicans, which are numerous around the island and the entire Gulf coast. The fleur-de-lis represents the presence of France on the island from 1699 to 1764. The sailing ship is a Spanish galleon to represent Spain's role in settling the area between 1781 and 1813.

Hurricanes 
Over the centuries, many hurricanes have struck the island. Some recent storms include:
 In 1969, Hurricane Camille flooded 70% of the island and was the worst storm to strike the area until Hurricane Frederic.
 In 1979, Hurricane Frederic (September 12) destroyed the bridge to the mainland, which had been opened in 1955.
 In 1997, Hurricane Danny caused extensive flooding on the east end of the island.
 In 1998, Hurricane Georges destroyed 41 houses on the island.
 In 2004, Hurricane Ivan caused nearly one-fourth of the island to be covered with approximately two feet of water.
 On August 29, 2005, Hurricane Katrina brought damage to parts of Dauphin Island. Some homes on the west end of the island were destroyed, and the Katrina Cut was formed as a channel splitting off the western part. However, most areas of the central and east end of the island experienced little flooding from the storm surge. The approach road to the island fared better than expected. The damage to most East End beachfront homes was limited to decks, stairs and storage buildings. In DeSoto Landing, a gated Gulf-front subdivision on Dauphin Island, the main homes had no water entering the homes unless a window or roof system failed; many avoided surge waters entirely. Damage was limited due to Sand Island (Pelican Island), a large sandbar south of DeSoto Landing which broke the force of battering waves. An oil drilling platform grounded near the island as the hurricane passed by.
 On September 14, 2020, storm surge from offshore Hurricane Sally flooded the island.

Tourist attractions
The old walled Fort Gaines is on the east end of Dauphin Island. A ferry from nearby Fort Morgan in Gulf Shores brings both vehicles and pedestrians to the island. One of the closest attractions to the ferry dock is The Estuarium, a fresh- and saltwater aquarium highlighting species native to Alabama.

The Dauphin Island Heritage and Arts Council features works by local artists, as well as information on the history of Dauphin Island. It organizes the annual Dauphin Island Native American Festival.

See also

 History of Mobile, Alabama
 Dauphin County, Pennsylvania

References

Further reading
 Elliott, Wendy, Research in Alabama (1987)

External links
 
 "Still in Harm's Way", NOW on PBS, video on Dauphin Island
 Dauphin Island Park and Beach Board
 Dauphin Island Foundation
 Historic Fort Gaines on Dauphin Island, Alabama

Barrier islands of Alabama
Towns in Mobile County, Alabama
Towns in Alabama
Populated coastal places in Alabama
Populated places established in 1702
French-American culture in Alabama
Landforms of Mobile County, Alabama
1702 establishments in the French colonial empire